Paul Collins (born 11 August 1966) is an English former professional footballer. He played for Gillingham between 1984 and 1987 making 37 appearances in the Football League. He also played for the England Youth team.

Honours
Maidstone United
Football Conference: 1988–89

References

1966 births
Living people
English footballers
Gillingham F.C. players
Wycombe Wanderers F.C. players
Maidstone United F.C. (1897) players
Footballers from West Ham
English Football League players
National League (English football) players
Association football midfielders